The 1925–26 WHL season was the fifth and last season for the now defunct Western Canada Hockey League (WCHL), which was renamed Western Hockey League (WHL) at the start of the season due to one of its Canadian teams, the Regina Capitals, moving to Portland, Oregon in the United States and being renamed the Portland Rosebuds. Six teams played 30 games each. At season's end, some of the teams reorganised to create a semi-pro league called the Prairie Hockey League that lasted for two seasons.  The WHL was the last league other than the National Hockey League to contest for the Stanley Cup.

Off-season
Regina's team folded, and a Portland club was formed and the Regina players transferred to it. There was discussions of moving the Edmonton team to Regina but it stayed in Edmonton. The new New York Americans bought Joe Simpson, John Morrison and Roy Rickey from Edmonton, but Edmonton would have enough talent left to win the WHL title.

Regular season

Final standings
Note: W = Wins, L = Losses, T = Ties, GF= Goals For, GA = Goals Against, Pts = Points

Playoffs
As in the previous season, the third place Victoria Cougars won the playoff championship. In the semi-final, the Cougars met the Saskatoon Sheiks.

Victoria wins two-game, total-goals series 4–3.

In the final, the Cougars faced off against the Edmonton Eskimos. As there was no ice available in Edmonton, Edmonton's 'home' game was played in Vancouver.

Victoria wins two-game, total-goals series 5–3.

Stanley Cup Finals

The Cougars faced the National Hockey League champion Montreal Maroons in a best-of-five series, losing three games to one.  After the WHL folded at the end of this season, the Stanley Cup would no longer be contested as a challenge tournament between league champions, but would be automatically awarded to the NHL champion, a custom formalized in 1947.

Player statistics

Scoring leaders

Goaltending averages

See also
 List of Stanley Cup champions
 List of pre-NHL seasons
 1925–26 NHL season
 1925 in sports
 1926 in sports

References

External links
HockeyDB

Western Canada Hockey League seasons
WCHL
WHL